Ypthima riukiuana is a butterfly in the family Nymphalidae (subfamily Satyrinae). It is an East Palearctic species endemic to Japan.

References

riukiuana
Butterflies described in 1906